

References

External links
 IMDB list of Hong Kong films
 Hong Kong films of 2011 at HKcinemamagic.com

2011
Hong Kong
Films